A peck is an imperial and United States customary unit of dry volume, equivalent to 2 dry gallons or 8 dry quarts or 16 dry pints. An imperial peck is equivalent to 9.09 liters and a US customary peck is equivalent to 8.81 liters. Two pecks make a kenning (obsolete), and four pecks make a bushel. Although the peck is no longer widely used, some produce, such as apples, are still often sold by the peck in the U.S. (although it is obsolete in the UK, found only in the old nursery rhyme "Peter Piper" and in the Bible – e.g., Matthew 5:15 in some older translations).

Scotland before 1824

In Scotland, the peck was used as a dry measure until the introduction of imperial units as a result of the Weights and Measures Act of 1824. The peck was equal to about 9 litres (1.98 Imp gal) (in the case of certain crops, such as wheat, peas, beans and meal) and about 13 litres (2.86 Imp gal) (in the case of barley, oats and malt). A firlot was equal to 4 pecks.

Conversions

See also 
 Bushel
 Obsolete Scottish units of measurement
 Winchester measure

References 

Units of volume
Customary units of measurement in the United States
Imperial units
Obsolete Scottish units of measurement
Obsolete units of measurement

eo:Buŝelo